Orion is a series of American solid-fuel rocket stages, developed and manufactured by a joint venture between Hercules Aerospace and Alliant Techsystems (now Northrop Grumman Innovation Systems). They were originally developed for use as all three stages on the Pegasus rocket, first flown in 1990. Orion is available in several configurations for a variety of use scenarios. All stages in this family are fueled by a mixture called QDL-1, which includes HTPB and 19% aluminium, with the exception of the yet-unflown Orion 32, which uses QDL-2, containing HTPB and 20% aluminium.

Versions 
Orion stages are numbered to indicate their configuration. The first number, either 38 or 50, indicates the diameter of the stage. This is followed by various letters. S indicates a stretched, first stage variant. XL indicates an additional stretch. G indicates a ground-launched stage, with a shorter nozzle. T indicates a strengthened skirt.

References 

Alliant Techsystems
Spaceflight
Solid-fuel rockets